Baniya or Bania is a surname of people belonging to the Hindu Chhetri (Kshatriya caste) of Nepal. The alternate spelling of Bania is also used by Chhetris. Indian use Bania It is also used as a family name by European people.

Notable people 
 Chandra Prakash Baniya (born 7 April 1951) is a Nepali writer, columnist, educator and politician.
Mohan Baniya, Nepalese politician
 Rabindra Singh Baniya, Nepalese Actor, Producer and Theatre Actor/Director.
Indra Bania, an Indian theatre actor, playwright

European Notable people
 Piotr Bania (born 1973), Polish football player
Rayyan Baniya,  (born 18 February 1999) is an Italian football player

Fictional Usage
 Kenny Bania, secondary character on the Seinfeld TV series

References 

Surnames
Khas surnames
Nepalese Hindus
Bania communities
Vaishya community